Thessaliotida is a former municipality in Phthiotis, Greece. Since the 2011 local government reform it is part of the municipality Domokos, of which it is a municipal unit. The municipal unit has an area of 155.004 km2. Population 3,313 (2011). The seat of the municipality was in Neo Monastiri.

References

External links
 Municipality of Thessaliotida 

Populated places in Phthiotis